Hayk Ghazaryan (23 August 1930 — 19 August 2014) was an Armenian historian and professor nominated to 2007 Nobel Prize for his "The Armenian Genocide in the Ottoman Empire" academic work. It consists of 2 volumes and was translated into Russian, Turkish and a number of European languages. Ghazaryan died in August 2014.

Book
Ghazaryan Hayk, The genocide of the Armenian people in the Ottoman Empire / by Hayk Ghazaryan . - Yerevan : Tigran Mets, 2005. - 335 p. : ill. ; 25 cm. - In English ; with bibliographical references in Armenian, Russian, French, German, and Turkish.

References

20th-century Armenian historians
2014 deaths
1930 births
21st-century Armenian historians